Coşkun Çörüz (born 15 August 1963 in Konakören) is a Dutch politician of Turkish descent. As a member of the Christian Democratic Appeal (Christen-Democratisch Appèl) he was an MP from 29 May 2001 to 19 September 2012. He focused on matters of security policy, judiciary, police, international law and human rights.

Çörüz is born in the Turkish district Salıpazarı. He studied law at the University of Amsterdam and was a member of the municipal council of Haarlem from 1998 to 2001. From May 2001 to September 2012 he was a member of the Dutch House of Representatives.

Decorations 
 In 2012 he was awarded Knight of the Order of Orange-Nassau.

References 
  Parlement.com biography

1963 births
Living people
21st-century Dutch politicians
Christian Democratic Appeal politicians
Dutch jurists
Dutch Muslims
Dutch people of Turkish descent
Knights of the Order of Orange-Nassau
Members of the House of Representatives (Netherlands)
Municipal councillors of Haarlem
People from Salıpazarı
Turkish emigrants to the Netherlands
University of Amsterdam alumni